David A. Harris Jr. is a United States Air Force major general who serves as the deputy commander of the Ninth Air Force. He previously served as the director of the Integration and Innovation Center.

References

External links
 

Living people
Place of birth missing (living people)
Recipients of the Defense Superior Service Medal
Recipients of the Distinguished Flying Cross (United States)
Recipients of the Legion of Merit
United States Air Force generals
United States Air Force personnel of the Iraq War
United States Air Force personnel of the War in Afghanistan (2001–2021)
Year of birth missing (living people)